Sigrún (Old Norse "victory rune") is a valkyrie in Norse mythology. Her story is related in Helgakviða Hundingsbana I and Helgakviða Hundingsbana II, in the Poetic Edda. The original editor annotated that she was Sváfa reborn.

The hero Helgi Hundingsbane first meets her when she leads a band of nine Valkyries:

The two fall in love, and Sigrún tells Helgi that her father Högni has promised her to Höðbroddr, the son of king Granmarr. Helgi invades Granmar's kingdom and slays anyone opposing their relationship. Only Sigrún's brother Dagr is left alive on condition that he swears fealty to Helgi.

Dagr is however obliged by honour to avenge his brothers and after having summoned Odin, the god gives him a spear. In a place called Fjoturlund, Dagr kills Helgi and goes back to his sister to tell her of his deed. Sigrún puts Dagr under a powerful curse after which he is obliged to live on carrion in the woods.

Helgi is put in a barrow, but returns from Valhalla one last time so that the two can spend a night together.

Sigrún dies early from sadness, but is reborn again as a Valkyrie. In the next life, she is Kára and Helgi is Helgi Haddingjaskati, whose story is related in Hrómundar saga Gripssonar.

Modern influence
Sigrún features in the 2018 video game God of War, in which she is the Valkyrie Queen. She can be fought by the player after defeating eight other Valkyries. Her fight is considered to be one of the most difficult and demanding encounters in the franchise. 

In 2022 she took a part in God of War Ragnarok. But this time she was an ally with Kratos, Freya, Mimir, Atreus and the shield maidens—her sisters. She and the other 8 Valkyries, her sisters are now free of the corruption spells of Odin thanks to the events which happened in God of War 2018.

Notes

References
 Orchard, Andy (1997). Dictionary of Norse Myth and Legend. Cassell. 

Valkyries